The 2011 Nigerian Senate election in Ebonyi State was held on April 9, 2011, to elect members of the Nigerian Senate to represent Ebonyi State. Chris Chukwuma Nwankwo representing Ebonyi North, Paulinus Igwe Nwagu representing Ebonyi Central and Sonni Ogbuoji representing Ebonyi South all won on the platform of Peoples Democratic Party.

Overview

Summary

Results

Ebonyi North 
Peoples Democratic Party candidate Chris Chukwuma Nwankwo won the election, defeating other party candidates.

Ebonyi Central 
Peoples Democratic Party candidate Paulinus Igwe Nwagu won the election, defeating other party candidates.

Ebonyi South 
Peoples Democratic Party candidate Sonni Ogbuoji won the election, defeating party candidates.

References 

Ebonyi State Senate elections
Ebonyi State senatorial elections
Ebonyi State senatorial elections